John Upton may refer to:

Politicians
John Upton (died c.1453), MP for Warwick
John Upton, 1st Viscount Templetown (1771–1846), British Member of Parliament for Bury St Edmunds
John Upton (died 1687) (1639–1687), British Member of Parliament for Dartmouth
John Upton (born 1718), Member of Parliament for Westmorland
John Upton (mayor), Mayor of Auckland City 1889–1891
John Upton (Irish politician), Member of the Parliament of Ireland for Antrim County 1725–1741
John Upton (died 1641) (1590–1641), British Member of Parliament for Dartmouth
John Upton, MP for Haverfordwest 1656–1660

Others
Sir John Upton (dead 1551), one of the last leaders of the English Langue of the Knights of St. John 
John Upton (civil engineer) (1774–1851), English civil engineer and contractor working in England and Russia
John Upton (Spenser editor) (1707–1760), early editor of Edmund Spenser
John Upton, president of the Baptist World Alliance
John A. Upton (born 1850), painter active in South Australia
John Charles Upton Jr. (?–2013), American documentary film maker